The 2019 Auto Club 400 was a Monster Energy NASCAR Cup Series race that was held on March 17, 2019, at Auto Club Speedway in Fontana, California. Contested over 200 laps on the  D-shaped oval, it was the fifth race of the 2019 Monster Energy NASCAR Cup Series season. The race was won by Kyle Busch, his 200th win across all three of NASCAR's national divisions.

Report

Background

It is also used for open wheel racing events. The racetrack is located near the former locations of Ontario Motor Speedway and Riverside International Raceway. The track is owned and operated by International Speedway Corporation. The speedway is served by the nearby Interstate 10 and Interstate 15 freeways as well as a Metrolink station located behind the backstretch.

Entry list

First practice

Qualifying
Austin Dillon scored the pole for the race with a time of 39.982 and a speed of  after no drivers completed a lap in the final round of qualifying.

Qualifying results

Practice (post-qualifying)

Second practice

Final practice

Race

Stage Results

Stage One
Laps: 60

Stage Two
Laps: 60

Final Stage Results

Stage Three
Laps: 80

Race statistics
 Lead changes: 18 among 9 different drivers
 Cautions/Laps: 4 for 22
 Red flags: 0
 Time of race: 2 hours, 47 minutes and 42 seconds
 Average speed:

Media

Television
The race was the 19th race Fox Sports covered at the Auto Club Speedway. Mike Joy, three-time Auto Club winner Jeff Gordon and Darrell Waltrip called the race in the booth for Fox. Jamie Little, Vince Welch and Matt Yocum handled the pit road duties for the television side.

Radio
MRN had the radio call for the race which was also simulcasted on Sirius XM NASCAR Radio. Alex Hayden, Jeff Striegle and 2001 race winner Rusty Wallace called the race from the booth when the field raced their way down the front stretch. Kyle Rickey called the race from a billboard outside turn 2 when the field raced their way through turns 1 and 2 & Dan Hubbard called the race from a billboard outside turn 3 when the field raced their way through turns 3 and 4. Winston Kelley, Steve Post and Dillon Welch had the pit road duties for MRN.

Standings after the race

Drivers' Championship standings

Manufacturers' Championship standings

Note: Only the first 16 positions are included for the driver standings.

References

Auto Club 400
Auto Club 400
Auto Club 400
NASCAR races at Auto Club Speedway